Admir Malkić (born 28 June 1986 in Croatia) is a Croatian footballer who is currently playing for NK Novigrad.

Club career
Malkic started his senior career with NK Pomorac 1921. In 2007, he signed for HNK Rijeka in the Croatian First Football League, where he made over four appearances. After that, he played for Croatian clubs NK Istra 1961 and NK Grobničan, and Jordanian club Al-Hussein SC, and Omani clubs Sohar SC and Dhofar Club, and Emirati club Al Urooba, and Omani club Al-Nahda Club.

References

External links
 
 Jedini Hrvat u Jordanu za Goal: Ovoliko u HNL-u ne bih zaradio, a prije utakmice - molitva 
 عضو بمجلس إدارة النهضــة: شكـوى ادمير خـــطأ نعــترف به وفي طريقه للنهاية 
 الانضباط تمنح الأندية الخمسة مهلة حتى 31 يوليو لتسوية أوضاعها المالية
 النهضة يتفوق على مسقط بهدفي ادمير ويوسف ناصر
 Admir Malkić, veznjak Grobničana: Vratili smo se pobjedama i to je najvažnije 
 Nisam izgubio ambiciju za višim rangom 
 Skupili smo glave, rezultat se vidio već u Novalji 
 Croatian Wikipedia Page 
 Statistike hrvatskog nogometa Profile 
 Hrvatski nogometni savez Profile

1986 births
Living people
Footballers from Rijeka
Association football midfielders
Croatian footballers
Croatia youth international footballers
HNK Orijent players
HNK Rijeka players
NK Pomorac 1921 players
NK Istra 1961 players
NK Žminj players
NK Istra players
NK Grobničan players
Al-Hussein SC (Irbid) players
Sohar SC players
Dhofar Club players
Al Urooba Club players
Al-Nahda Club (Oman) players
NK Novigrad players
Croatian Football League players
Oman Professional League players
Croatian expatriate footballers
Expatriate footballers in Jordan
Croatian expatriate sportspeople in Jordan
Expatriate footballers in Oman
Croatian expatriate sportspeople in Oman
Expatriate footballers in the United Arab Emirates
Croatian expatriate sportspeople in the United Arab Emirates